The Ocoliș is a small river in the Apuseni Mountains, Alba County, western Romania. It is a left tributary of the river Arieș. It flows through Ocoliș commune, and joins the Arieș in the village Ocoliș. It is fed by several smaller streams, including Tisa, Pociovaliștea, and Craca.

References

Rivers of Romania
Rivers of Alba County